Frank James Clair (May 12, 1917 – April 3, 2005) was an American gridiron football player, coach, and executive.  Nicknamed "the Professor" for his ability to recognize and develop talent, he served as a head coach in the Canadian Football League (CFL) with the Toronto Argonauts from 1950 to 1954 and the Ottawa Rough Riders from 1956 to 1969. Clair ranks third all-time in CFL history with 147 regular season wins and first in postseason victories with 27. He is also tied for the most Grey Cup championships won by a head coach with five. He won the Annis Stukus Trophy as the CFL's coach of the year in 1966 and 1969.

Playing career
Clair played end for the Ohio State Buckeyes, lettering in 1938, 1939, and 1940. As a receiver, he was quarterback Don Scott's favorite target. In 1941, Clair played in seven games for the Washington Redskins.

Coaching career
Clair found his greatest success in coaching. He was the head football coach at the University at Buffalo in 1948 and 1949. During the 1950s, he coached the Toronto Argonauts to two Grey Cups in 1950  and 1952.

In 1956, he joined the Ottawa Rough Riders. As coach, Clair led them to Grey Cup Championships in 1960, 1968 and 1969. After retiring from coaching following the 1969 season, became the team's general manager, where they won Grey Cups in 1973 and 1976. He was let go by the team in 1978. He was inducted into the Canadian Football Hall of Fame in 1981.

The stadium at Lansdowne Park was renamed Frank Clair Stadium in his honour on April 8, 1993. He was inducted into the Ontario Sports Hall of Fame in 1998. Clair lived in retirement at his home, and he died in Sarasota, Florida on April 3, 2005, In 2014, the stadium was renamed TD Place, and the operators erected a statue of Clair in his honour.

Head coaching record

College

CFL

See also
 List of Canadian Football League head coaches by wins

References

External links
 

1917 births
2005 deaths
American football ends
Buffalo Bulls football coaches
Miami RedHawks football coaches
Ohio State Buckeyes football players
Ottawa Rough Riders coaches
Ottawa Rough Riders general managers
Purdue Boilermakers football coaches
Toronto Argonauts coaches
Washington Redskins players
Canadian Football Hall of Fame inductees
Canadian football people from Ottawa
Players of American football from Cincinnati
Players of Canadian football from Cincinnati